The Violin of Monsieur is a 1914 silent short film directed by James Young and starring his wife Clara Kimball Young. It was produced by the Vitagraph Company of America and distributed by the General Film Company.

Cast
Etienne Girardot - Pere Gerome
Clara Kimball Young - Yvonne - Gerome's Daughter
James Young - Jean - Yvonne's Sweetheart
Helen Connelly - Little Yvonne
Shep the Dog - Napoleon, the dog

References

External links
 The Violin of Monsieur at IMDb.com

1914 films
American silent short films
American black-and-white films
Lost American films
Films directed by James Young
1910s American films